The Republican Coalition (CR) was a Spanish electoral alliance created for the 1914 Spanish general election between the Radical Republican Party (PRR) and the Republican Nationalist Federal Union (UFNR). It would come to be known as the "Sant Gervasi Agreement".

Composition

References

Bibliography
 

Defunct political parties in Spain
Political parties established in 1914
Political parties disestablished in 1917
1914 establishments in Spain
1917 disestablishments in Spain
Radical parties
Republican parties in Spain